Ornarantia wagneri is a moth in the family Choreutidae. It was described by Rota in 2012.

References

Natural History Museum Lepidoptera generic names catalog

Choreutidae
Moths described in 2012